Serrano Creek is a roughly  tributary of San Diego Creek in the U.S. state of California. The creek starts in the Santa Ana Mountains in a canyon in Whiting Ranch Wilderness Park, near the boundary of the Cleveland National Forest. It then flows southwest into the city of Lake Forest, running in a channelized course roughly parallel to Aliso Creek. It abruptly turns northwest then southwest at 90-degree angles as it enters a large storm drain that takes it the rest of the way to the confluence with the La Cañada Channel, creating the main stem of San Diego Creek.

References

Orange County, California articles needing infoboxes
Rivers of Orange County, California
Rivers of Southern California